H. acutirostris may refer to:
 Heteralocha acutirostris, the huia, an extinct bird species of New Zealand
 Hyperolius acutirostris, a frog species

See also
 Acutirostris